Flowers Around Cleveland is an album by David Murray released on the French Bleu Regard label. It was released in 1995 and features seven quartet performances by Murray with pianist Bobby Few, bassist Jean Jacques Avenel and drummer John Betsch.

Reception
The Allmusic review by Thom Jurek awarded the album 4 stars stating "This is one of Murray's records to seek out.".

Track listing
 "Fantasy Rainbow" – 8:33  
 "Few's Blues" (Few) – 8:06  
 "The Desagregation of Our Children" – 10:36  
 "Sorrow Song (For W.E.B. Dubois)" – 10:52  
 "Dakar Darkness" – 6:35  
 "When the Monarchs Come to Town" – 9:09  
 "Flowers Around Cleveland" (Avenel, Betsch, Few, Murray) – 8:43  
All compositions by David Murray except as indicated 
 Recorded May 16 & 17, 1995

Personnel
David Murray – tenor saxophone
Bobby Few – piano
John Betsch – drums
Jean Jacques Avenel – bass

References 

1995 live albums
David Murray (saxophonist) live albums